Carmel Hai-Bar Nature Reserve is a  breeding and acclimation center administered by the Israel Nature Reserves and National Parks Authority, situated in the Carmel mountains in northwestern Israel, within the larger Mount Carmel National Park. The Carmel Hai-Bar is the Mediterranean climate counterpart of the Yotvata Hai-Bar Nature Reserve which operates in the desert. Haifa University is located next to the entrance to the park.

Endangered and extinct animals (which formerly lived in Israel) are bred here for possible reintroduction to the Mediterranean forest of northern Israel.

Some of the species bred here are:

Griffon vulture (Gyps fulvus)
Persian fallow deer (Dama dama mesopotamica)
Mountain gazelle (Gazella gazella gazella)
Roe deer (Capreolus capreolus coxi)
White-tailed eagle (Haliaeetus albicilla)
Fire salamander (Salamandra infraimmaculata)

References

External links

Nature reserves in Israel
Protected areas of Northern District (Israel)